The Tavern, also known as the Jesse Hinderliter House, is a historic tavern house at 214 East 3rd Street in Little Rock, Arkansas.  It is a two-story log structure, with a gabled roof and clapboarded exterior.  Built c. 1820 and enlarged about 1834, it is believed to be the only surviving building in Little Rock from the state's territorial period.  Its interior has exposed log beams with beaded corners, and an original hand-carved mantel.

The building was listed on the National Register of Historic Places in 1970.

See also
National Register of Historic Places listings in Little Rock, Arkansas

References

Drinking establishments on the National Register of Historic Places in Arkansas
Commercial buildings completed in 1820
Buildings and structures in Little Rock, Arkansas
National Register of Historic Places in Little Rock, Arkansas